Aboubacar Sylla (born 23 December 1983 in Conakry) is a Guinean former professional footballer who played as a striker. He played on the professional level in Ligue 2 for FC Gueugnon.

External links
 
 

1983 births
Living people
Guinean footballers
Association football forwards
Guinea international footballers
Ligue 2 players
Championnat National 2 players
Championnat National 3 players
FC Gueugnon players
FC Montceau Bourgogne players
AS Cherbourg Football players
Montluçon Football players
FC Aurillac Arpajon Cantal Auvergne players
SA Thiers players
Guinean expatriate footballers
Guinean expatriate sportspeople in France
Expatriate footballers in France